Shawn Jackson (born 6 September 2000) is an American tennis player.

Jackson made his ATP main draw debut at the 2020 New York Open after receiving a wildcard for the doubles main draw.

Jackson plays college tennis for Hofstra University.

References

External links

2000 births
Living people
American male tennis players
Sportspeople from Staten Island
Hofstra Pride athletes
Tennis people from New York (state)
College men's tennis players in the United States